Henry of Württemberg (7 September 1448 – 15 April 1519) was, from 1473 to 1482, count of Montbéliard.

Life
Henry was the second son of Count Ulrich V of Württemberg-Stuttgart (1413–1480), from his second marriage to Elisabeth of Bavaria-Landshut (1419–1451). As a second son, Henry was provided with a career in the clergy. In 1464, he became provost at Eichstätt. The intent was that he would succeed Adolph II of Nassau as Archbishop of Mainz.

To that end, he was appointed as Adolph's coadjutor and worldly regent in 1465.  This plan had been masterminded by the powerful Elector Albrecht III Achilles of Brandenburg, who married his daughter Elisabeth to Henry's brother Eberhard II. This would bind the Archbishopric of Mainz tightly to the Margraviate of Brandenburg and to the imperial party, which was led by Albrecht Achilles, and to which Henry's father Ulrich V also belonged.

The archbishop of Mainz was one of the seven electors and thus had considerable influence on policy in the Holy Roman Empire of German Nation. The plan was directed against the Wittelsbach family, and in particular Elector Palatine Frederick I, who had humiliated Ulrich V in the Battle of Seckenheim in 1462. The Archbishop of Mainz, however, disagreed with the plan and refused to play the intended rôle.

This led to the so-called "coadjutor feud" from 1465 to 1467. In 1466, Count John of Wertheim declared a feud against Henry.  This feud escalated to a conflict between the great princes of the Empire and almost to a civil war.  In the end, the Elector Palatine won the conflict on a diplomatic level and Henry and the other Württembergs stood empty-handed. Henry was compensated with the district of Bischofsheim, which he returned to the Electorate of Mainz in 1470.

The 1473 Treaty of Urach awarded the county of Montbéliard and the other Württemberg possessions on the left bank of the Rhine to Henry. In the course of a dispute between Duke Charles the Bold of Burgundy and Emperor Frederick III, Charles took Henry prisoner in 1474. The captivity lasted until 1477 and Henry was treated very badly, allegedly including a mock execution. After his father's death in 1480, Henry claimed a part of the inheritance, in particular Württemberg-Stuttgart.  He did not succeed, and in the 1482 Treaty of Reichenweier, he gave the county of Montbéliard to his brother, Eberhard II.

In 1490, his cousin Eberhard I had Henry arrested in Stuttgart, on the grounds of an alleged mental illness.  In 1492, Emperor Frederick III appointed Eberhard I as Henry's legal guardian. Until his death in 1519, Henry and his wife, Eva, were held prisoner on Hohenurach Castle, although they were occasionally allowed to visit Stuttgart.

Importance
In 1999, the historian Klaus Graf tried to rehabilitate Henry, who had been stigmatized as a madman by the historiography of Württemberg.

He referred to Henry's intellectual interests, which we can infer from his collections of prints and manuscripts.  In 2004, Felix Heinzer tried to compare Henry and Eberhard I as book lovers, based on a recently discovered book from Henry's collection.

Marriage and issue

Henry married in 1485 Countess Elisabeth of Zweibrücken-Bitsch.   Elizabeth died on 17 February 1487, a few days after giving birth to her son, Eitel Henry, on 8 February 1487. At his confirmation in 1493, Eitel Henry's name was changed to Ulrich and he later became the third Duke of Württemberg.

Henry married again on 21 July 1488, the Countess Eva of Salm; they had two children:
 Maria (1496–1541), married Duke Henry V of Brunswick-Lüneburg
 George I of Württemberg-Mömpelgard (1498–1558)
Henry was thus the founder of older line Württemberg-Mömpelgard.

Ancestors

References
 Klaus Graf: 3.1.1 Heinrich, in: Sönke Lorenz, Dieter Mertens, Volker Press (eds.): Das Haus Württemberg. Ein biographisches Lexikon, Kohlhammer, Stuttgart 1997, pp. 123–124
 Gerold Hayer, Ulrich Müller: Flebilis heu maestos cogor inire modos: Gefängnis-Literatur des Mittelalters und der Fall des württembergischen Grafen Heinrich (1448–1519), in: Licht der Natur. Medizin in Fachliteratur und Dichtung. Festschrift für Gundolf Keil zum 60 Geburtstag, Göppingen, 1994, pp. 171–193
 Michael Bärmann: Der Verfasser des Buches der Beispiele als Entrepreneur? Neuaufgefundene Lebenszeugnisse zu Antonius von Pforr, in: Daphnis 37, 2008, pp. 381–408 Review with further information

External links

Footnotes 

1448 births
1519 deaths
15th-century German people
Counts of Montbéliard
16th-century German people